Rex Allen Hudler (born September 2, 1960) is an American former Major League Baseball utility player and color commentator for the Kansas City Royals. He played a total of 14 seasons after being a first round draft pick of the New York Yankees in 1978.

Playing career
Hudler played for six different Major League Baseball teams, and at every position except pitcher and catcher throughout his career: the New York Yankees (1984–1985), Baltimore Orioles (1986), Montreal Expos (1988–1990), St. Louis Cardinals (1990–1992), California Angels (1994–1996), and Philadelphia Phillies (1997–1998). He also played for the Yakult Swallows of the Japanese Central League in 1993, contributing to the team's Japan Series championship.

A 1978 graduate of Bullard High School (Fresno, California), Hudler played baseball, soccer and football, earning first-team All-America honors as a wide receiver. Prior to signing with the Yankees, Hudler was visited by Notre Dame, which hoped that he would suit up for their football team.

Hudler saw playing time in the minor leagues with the Rochester Red Wings of the Triple-A International League in 1986 and 1987. He then saw playing time with the Triple-A Indianapolis Indians of the American Association in 1988 as the starting third baseman.

Hudler was nicknamed "Bug-Eater" during his time in St. Louis. During a game, he picked an enormous June bug off his cap. Cardinals teammate Tom Pagnozzi dared him to eat it. His teammates collectively offered him $800 to eat the bug, which he accepted.

Hudler was a 1999 inductee into the Fresno Athletic Hall of Fame.

Broadcasting career
From 1999 through the 2009 season, Hudler was the color commentator for the Los Angeles Angels of Anaheim radio and television broadcasting team, alongside play-by-play announcers Steve Physioc, Rory Markas, and Terry Smith. He is also the color commentator for the PlayStation 2 and PlayStation Portable games MLB 06: The Show, 07, 08, 09, 10, and 11 and is also featured in 10 for the PlayStation 3 along with Dave Campbell and Matt Vasgersian. For the 2011 edition on the PlayStation 3, he was replaced by Eric Karros.  He also provided color commentary, with ESPN's Jon Miller on play-by-play, for the 2004 Xbox and PlayStation 2 title ESPN Major League Baseball.

Hudler was suspended briefly from his broadcast job in 2003 after being arrested at Kansas City International Airport for possession of cannabis and medical paraphernalia.

In November 2009 the Angels and FSN West announced they would not renew the contracts of Hudler and Physioc for the 2010 season.

In October 2010, Hudler hosted The Wonder Dog Hour on Angels flagship station KLAA, 830 AM in Orange, California.

On February 13, 2012, he was announced as the new television color commentator for the Kansas City Royals, teaming up with Ryan Lefebvre and his old partner Steve Physioc.

Personal life
Hudler was hospitalized in 2001 with a brain aneurysm.

References

External links

Rex Hudler at Baseball Almanac
Rex Hudler 

1960 births
Living people
American expatriate baseball players in Canada
American expatriate baseball players in Japan
Baltimore Orioles players
Baseball players from Arizona
Buffalo Bisons (minor league) players
California Angels players
Fort Lauderdale Yankees players
Kansas City Royals announcers
Los Angeles Angels of Anaheim announcers
Major League Baseball outfielders
Major League Baseball second basemen
Montreal Expos players
Nashville Sounds players
New York Yankees players
Nippon Professional Baseball first basemen
Nippon Professional Baseball second basemen
Philadelphia Phillies players
Sportspeople from Tempe, Arizona
St. Louis Cardinals players
Yakult Swallows players